Paddy Wilson (born 25 June 1946), sometimes known as Pat Wilson, is a retired Scottish footballer who played in the Scottish League for Berwick Rangers, Raith Rovers, Dunfermline Athletic, Aberdeen and Cowdenbeath as an outside right. He was the first substitute to be utilised by Aberdeen in a competitive match. After his retirement as a player, Wilson managed Cowdenbeath.

Personal life 
Wilson's father was involved in football and managed Blairhall Colliery in the early 1960s. After leaving football, Wilson worked as a salesman in the drinks industry and ran the East Port Bar in Dunfermline.

Career statistics

References 

Scottish footballers
Cowdenbeath F.C. players
Scottish Football League players
Association football outside forwards
Living people
Berwick Rangers F.C. players
Cowdenbeath F.C. managers
Scottish Football League managers
Scottish football managers
Footballers from Fife
Dunfermline Athletic F.C. players
Aberdeen F.C. players
Raith Rovers F.C. players
1946 births
Blairhall Colliery F.C. players
Scottish Junior Football Association players

Raith Rovers F.C. non-playing staff